Nikos Giannitsanis (born 16 February 1994) is a Greek professional footballer who plays as centre forward for Super League 2 club Proodeftiki.

Club career

Early career
On 19 October 2012, Giannitsanis along with three other players, signed his first professional contract with Panathinaikos. On December 19, 2012, he made his professional debut with Panathinaikos. On 9 July 2014 he was loaned to Niki Volos. After being released from Panathinaikos he signed a contract with Lamia. On 26 August 2015 he signed a contract with Panelefsiniakos.

AEL and Trikala
His productive season gained him a three-year contract with Superleague side AEL. One month later he was loaned to Trikala. On 6 November 2016 he scored his first goal in an away loss against Panserraikos. On 23 April 2017, he scored his first career hat-trick in a 5–0 home win against Aiginiakos. He appeared in 36 games, 31 for the Football League and 5 for the Cup, scoring 15 and 2 goals respectively.

Return to AEL
On 28 August 2017 he made his debut for AEL in a 1–1 home draw against Asteras Tripoli. On 25 October 2017, he scored his first goal in a 3–0 home win against Panachaiki for the Cup.

Return to Trikala
On 10 January 2018, he returned to Trikala.

Meuselwitz
On 16 July 2018, he agreed to join Meuselwitz on a free stransfer.

Apollon Smyrnis
On 11 July 2019, he signed a contract with Apollon Smyrnis.

Club statistics

Honours
Panathinaikos
Greek Cup: 2014

References

External links
 

1994 births
Living people
Greek expatriate footballers
Athlitiki Enosi Larissa F.C. players
Greece youth international footballers
Panathinaikos F.C. players
Niki Volos F.C. players
Super League Greece players
Trikala F.C. players
Association football forwards
Panelefsiniakos F.C. players
Footballers from Athens
Greek footballers